On December 18–20, 1957, a significant tornado outbreak sequence affected the southern Midwest and the South of the contiguous United States. The outbreak sequence began on the afternoon of December 18, when a low-pressure area approached the southern portions of Missouri and Illinois. Total losses in the state were estimated to fall within the range of $8–$10 million.

Background
At 6:00 a.m. CST (12:00 UTC) on December 18, 1957, a vigorous shortwave trough entered the Great Plains with a cold front moving east across Oklahoma and Kansas. A dissipating stationary front over Oklahoma underwent frontolysis and later redeveloped as a warm front which extended across central Illinois. By 3:00 pm. CST (21:00 UTC), surface dew points reached the low 60s °F across portions of southeast Missouri and southern Illinois, including the St. Louis area. Although most areas were then recording overcast weather conditions, a strong upper-level jet stream helped impart synoptic-scale lifting, a factor that favors updrafts, and little vertical mixing occurred, so instability remained favorable for thunderstorm development. Additionally, very cold temperatures following a surface cyclone raised the lifted index to −6 due to high adiabatic lapse rates. Conditions were therefore very conducive to a large tornado outbreak on the afternoon of December 18.

Similarly favorable conditions occurred a day later, as a warm and moist air mass spread northward from the Gulf of Mexico. In fact, temperatures in the Mississippi Valley and the upper Midwest approached record highs for December. Local residents and meteorologists described temperatures as being "springlike" for the time of year, even though meteorological winter was due to begin on December 23. Farther south, temperatures along the Gulf Coast reached the low 70s °F. Just as on December 18, a second tornado outbreak occurred in a broad warm sector from Arkansas to Illinois and south to Alabama.

Confirmed tornadoes

December 18 event

December 19 event

December 20 event

Mount Vernon, Illinois

The second deadly tornado to develop on December 18 became one of two tornadoes to strike Mount Vernon in Jefferson County, Illinois. The first tornado was the strongest and formed at 3:55 pm. As the tornado approached downtown Mount Vernon, it completely levelled small, "prefabricated", ranch-style homes in southwest Mount Vernon; damage in this area was later rated F4 by meteorologists, though on the low end of the category. Thereafter, the tornado weakened as it neared downtown Mount Vernon and may have even dissipated before reforming as a separate tornado to the north. It then continued on a skipping path and caused less severe damage to older homesites northeast of Mount Vernon. In Mount Vernon, the tornado damaged or destroyed about fifteen to twenty buildings, including the Block Grade School, where students left only half an hour beforehand. The funnel was described as being "swirling black clouds", filled with debris, that vanished northwest of downtown Mount Vernon.

Sunfield, Illinois

At 4:35 pm. CST (22:35 UTC) on December 18, the only F5 tornado of the outbreak sequence destroyed the entire community of Sunfield in Perry County, Illinois. The powerful tornado touched down at the intersection of U.S. Route 51 and Illinois Route 154, which was then the location of Sunfield. The extreme damage only occurred in the small settlement, which reportedly completely vanished. One man who could not seek shelter in time died in an exposed location. Six other people were injured. The community of Sunfield has since relocated and is presently sited to the south of the intersection.

Gorham–Sand Ridge–Murphysboro–Plumfield, Illinois

This tornado, the deadliest of the outbreak sequence, closely resembled the 1925 Tri-State tornado and affected some of the same areas that were hit in 1925, including locations in and near Gorham, Sand Ridge, Murphysboro, and De Soto. It may have touched down in eastern Missouri but was first observed at 4:45 pm. CST (some sources say 4:30 pm. CST) in Gorham, destroying or damaging forty homes there. One fatality occurred in nearby Sand Ridge.  As it neared and passed through the southeast side of Murphysboro, the tornado paralleled the Big Muddy River, moving east-northeast. It produced the worst damage, posthumously rated F4, in this area, destroying old buildings; however, the most intense damage only affected a small section of southeast Murphysboro, where 10 of the 11 deaths occurred. Afterward, the tornado continued on to damage parts of De Soto, Hurst, and Bush. The tornado was last reported near Plumfield at 5:05 pm. CST (23:05 UTC). Murphysboro was powerless for almost three days as most utilities were in the worst-hit area. The tornado injured two hundred people along its path.

Non-tornadic effects
Severe winds estimated at up to  also affected the Hannibal area in that state, downing power lines and wires. In addition to the six known tornadoes in Missouri, unconfirmed reports of tornadoes occurred in Jefferson County, along with many reports of funnel clouds elsewhere in the state. Other unconfirmed tornadoes were reported in other states, including an alleged tornado that hit Rockville, Indiana. On December 19, a dust storm with  wind gusts tossed three roofs onto vehicles and reduced visibility to just  in Dallas, Texas. In addition to the three confirmed tornadoes that hit the state that day, severe winds in Tennessee, reportedly unrelated to tornado activity, destroyed farm buildings, tore off roofs, and downed trees and electrical wires; though these may have been due to tornadoes, none was confirmed. In addition to two confirmed tornadoes, unconfirmed reports of tornado damage arrived from Royalton and Elkville, Illinois; though attributed to thunderstorm winds, these damages may have been due to tornadoes. Additionally, severe thunderstorm activity on December 18–19 contributed to severe flood conditions across parts of southern Illinois and in Missouri.

Aftermath and recovery
After severe weather left the Murphysboro area in Illinois, police officers, firefighters, deputies, and other assistance were called out to the worst-hit subdivisions, Country Heights and Crown View. Then-Illinois Director of Public Health Dr. Roland Cross also sent for the hard-hit Mount Vernon area. Then-Governor of Illinois William G. Stratton directed Illinois state police to the affected areas of southern Illinois and also readied the Illinois National Guard for possible deployment to the region.

See also
List of tornadoes and tornado outbreaks
List of North American tornadoes and tornado outbreaks
List of F5 and EF5 tornadoes
Southern Illinois tornado history
St. Louis tornado history
Tornado records
Tornado outbreak of March 27, 1890 – Yielded numerous deadly, violent tornadoes
Tornado outbreak sequence of May 1896 – Produced the third-deadliest tornado in U.S. history
Tri-State tornado outbreak – Impacted some of the same areas as in 1957 on March 18, 1925
2012 Leap Day tornado outbreak – Produced an EF4-rated tornado on February 29
Tornado outbreak of November 17, 2013 – Deadliest and costliest on record in Illinois since 1950
Tornado outbreak of December 10–11, 2021 – Deadliest tornado outbreak in the month of December

Notes

References

Sources

 

F4 tornadoes by date
F5 tornadoes by date
Tornadoes of 1957
Tornadoes in Missouri
Tornadoes in Illinois
Tornadoes in Arkansas
Tornado outbreak sequence